The Crystal River Old City Hall is a historic building in Crystal River, Florida, in the United States. It is located at 532 North Citrus Avenue, off U.S. 19/98. On May 29, 1998, it was added to the National Register of Historic Places.

The building now houses the Coastal Heritage Museum, operated by the Citrus County Historical Society.  Exhibits focus on the early history of the west side of Citrus County, Florida and include a 1929 diorama of downtown Citrus Avenue, a fish house facade, and an original jail cell.  Admission is free.

References

External links
 Coastal Heritage Museum - Citrus County Historical Society
 Coastal Heritage Museum - City of Crystal River information

City and town halls in Florida
Buildings and structures in Citrus County, Florida
Museums in Citrus County, Florida
City and town halls on the National Register of Historic Places in Florida
History museums in Florida
Works Progress Administration in Florida
Former seats of local government
National Register of Historic Places in Citrus County, Florida
1939 establishments in Florida
Government buildings completed in 1939